Aux Marocains is a confectionery, located 33 rue Clemenceau in the French spa city of Vichy in the Département of Allier, in center of France. Established in 1860, it is still active. Its name come from a candy — Le Marocain (The Marocan) — that was created there in the early 20th century and is still produced, a variant of  another candy, the Négus de Nevers. The facade of the building, the storefront (Art Deco) and the interior of the shop (Second Empire-style) are listed on the Supplementary Inventory of Monument historique since 1990.

Photo gallery

External link

References 

French confectionery
Monuments historiques of Allier
Vichy
1860 establishments in France